Softline Holding Plc, the holding company of the Softline Group, is a Cyprus-registered company with the headquarters in London. 

Operating in Russia, Eastern Europe, Central Asia, Americas, India and Southeast Asia covering 95 cities in more than 50 countries. Softline offers private and public cloud, integrated technology, cybersecurity, software licensing, provisioning of hardware, and many other IT related services.

Softline has partnerships with more than 6,000 software and hardware vendors including Microsoft, Oracle, VMware, Adobe, HPE, IBM, EMC, Symantec, Dell, Citrix, Autodesk, Cisco Systems, Salesforce.com, Kaspersky Lab, Huawei, Alloy Software amongst others.

History  

The company was founded in 1993 in Moscow as a supplier of scientific software. The domain name softline.ru, registered on September 13, 1996, is considered one of the oldest (11th) in the ‘.ru’ domain.

By 1998, the company's main business was reselling software from Microsoft, Symantec, IBM, and other vendors. In 1999, Softline launched services including a Training Center and expanded its vendors portfolio to over 500. 

In 2001, the company added a consulting division and opened its first representative office outside Moscow, in Minsk, Republic of Belarus.

From 2002, further expansion took place with the opening of representative offices in Kiev, Khabarovsk and Nizhniy Novgorod in 2002 and Almaty, Tashkent, Novosibirsk, and Yekaterinburg in 2003 followed by a range of Russian and CIS cities. New services introduced over these years were technical support, IT outsourcing, auditing, Microsoft Dynamics and SAP and IT infrastructure build and run services. 

In 2002, the online website store for small businesses and individuals called www.allsoft.ru was launched.

In 2008, Softline opened representative offices outside Russia and the CIS, including Turkey, Venezuela, and Vietnam. In subsequent years, the company has entered the local IT market in 30 countries within different regions of the world. 

In 2009, Softline launched Venture Partners, an investment fund for promising IT startups. In 2010, Softline's focus was on integrating services in a single management framework. There was significant growth in cloud, hardware and information security services. 

In 2014, the group opened a subsidiary in India.

Since 2014, Softline is ranked within the Top Five Russian IT companies, according to RIA Novosti, Russia's international news agency. Softline portfolio includes a range of technology services,  with a special focus on public, private and hybrid clouds, based on both in-house and public data centers. Large service projects have been undertaken for corporate customers notably Gazprom, Transneft, and Rusagro among others.

In 2015, Softline became Microsoft's global partner with LSP status in 19 countries. With investment support from Sovcombank, Softline acquired Compusoftware, a Brazilian provider in licensing and infrastructure services. The same year Softline has been successful in building a 600+ rack datacenter in Belarus, the largest in Eastern Europe. 

In 2016, Softline raised equity from DaVinci Capital and since has engaged in a series of mergers and acquisitions that expanded the company's products and geographical presence.

In 2017, Softline acquired Enaza (proprietary IP outsourced managed platform to enable telecom customers to sell software subscriptions). The company is recognised as Microsoft Country Partner of the Year 2017 in Chili, Cambodia and Kazakhstan. Softline E-commerce (formerly Allsoft Ecommerce) expanded into several countries in Western Europe, Latin America and Asia.

In 2018, Softline acquired a minority stake in Crayon, a Norwegian IT advisory firm which provides software licensing, software asset management and consulting services. The group launched Softline Digital Laboratory and Softline Digital Platform. Softline also receives a credit rating from Standard and Poor's and completes its first Public Bond offering. The company is recognised as Microsoft Country Partner of the Year 2018 in Cambodia for the second year running  and Softline's ecommerce team receives “Best Customer Experience team” from CX World Awards.

In 2019, Softline acquires High Technologies Center, a company specialising in custom software development, including design, development, quality assurance and software testing, ongoing maintenance and support, and requirement analytics. The company expands to Egypt, Czech Republic, Poland, South Korea and Sri Lanka, and achieves global Microsoft Azure Expert Managed Service Provider (MSP) status.

In 2020, Softline opened its new HQ in London, placed two Public Bonds and improved its S&P credit rating to B-Stable. Softline closed three M&A deals by acquiring Embee - one of the leading IT market players in India, Aplana – a Software Development outsourcing company, and Softline AG – an IT consulting group headquartered in Germany with subsidiaries in Austria, Belgium, the Netherlands and the UK. Softline's annual revenue exceeds US$1.8 billion.

In 2021, Softline received multiple Microsoft Advanced Specializations in Kubernetes on Azure, Linux and Open Source Database Migration to Azure, and Windows Virtual Desktop. The company's operations in Bulgaria, Cambodia, Malaysia and Vietnam are all awarded “Partner of the Year” by Microsoft. Softline Ecommerce was also highlighted by IDC in its Vendor Spotlight 2021 report.

Softline’s leadership and management team 
The non-executive chairman of the board of directors is Jacques Guers. The Global CEO is Roy Harding. Founder and major stakeholder Igor Borovikov currently acting as executive director.

Softline Group of companies
The Softline Group of companies consists of independent subsidiary companies operating under their own names with distinctive service offerings within different IT areas. These are as follows:
 Axoft (Russia) – independent software distributor.
 ActiveCloud (Belarus, Russia) – Independent cloud provider, joined Softline Group in 2010.
 Novakom (Belarus) – Information systems developer for governmental agencies and businesses, specialising in ECM and management systems for the industry. It was acquired by Softline in 2012.
 Compusoftware (Brazil) – Was acquired by Softline in 2016.
 Mirapolis (Russia) – A human capital management company specialising in HR, distance learning tools and webinars. This is a portfolio project of Softline Venture Partners.
 Aflex (Russia) – Software distributor acquired by Softline Group of companies.

Other members of Softline Group include IT MAN, Stakhanovets, Videobaker, Copiny and Tekmi.

Venture investment 

Corporate investment fund Softline Venture Partners makes venture investments in independent developers of software on the territory of Russia, CIS and other countries where Softline is present.

As part of the work of Softline Venture Partners, 11 projects were invested in:  Tekmi, Mirapolis, ActiveCloud, Daripodarki, Magazinga, EZLogin, Client24, Copiny, Smart Start, Apps4All and «Контекстный брокер».

References 

Russian companies established in 1993
Software companies of Russia
Companies based in London
Companies based in Moscow